Lisa Peluso (born July 29, 1964) is an American soap opera actress.

Life and career
Peluso was born in Philadelphia, Pennsylvania, the daughter of Mary Peluso. Her first big break came at the age of nine, when she starred in the Broadway production of Gypsy with Angela Lansbury. In 1977, at age thirteen, she played Linda, the younger sister of John Travolta's Tony, in the classic film Saturday Night Fever.

Later in 1977, Peluso debuted on daytime television as Wendy Wilkins on Search for Tomorrow, a role she played until December 1985, one year before the series ended. Peluso replaced Andrea McArdle who vacated the role to star in the Broadway musical Annie.  While playing "Wendy", a sixteen-year-old Peluso received her first on-screen kiss from Kevin Bacon.

Other important soap credentials include her portrayal of "Ava Rescott Masters" on Loving (1988–1995), as well as her portrayal of Lila Hart Roberts Cory Winthrop on Another World (1997–1999) and continued the character on As the World Turns (1999).  She has also appeared twice on the ABC soap opera One Life to Live, first as "Billie Giordano"  from 1987 to 1988, then as "Gina Russo" in 2001.

She also made a guest star appearance on Designing Women, playing "Shannon",  who irritates Julia Sugarbaker (Dixie Carter) while working as an assistant lawyer to Julia's Beau, Reese Watson (Hal Holbrook).

Peluso was featured on a 2002 episode of the TLC Network series A Baby Story, chronicling her pregnancy and the birth of her second child, Parker Nathaniel Guice. She and her husband, photographer Brad Guice, also have a daughter, Phoebe Ann Guice, who shares the same birthday (July 29) as Lisa.

References

External links

1964 births
American soap opera actresses
American people of Italian descent
Living people
Actresses from Philadelphia
21st-century American women